The 2011 MSBL season was the 23rd season of the Men's State Basketball League (SBL). The regular season began on Friday 18 March and ended on Saturday 23 July. The finals began on Friday 29 July and ended on Saturday 27 August, when the Wanneroo Wolves defeated the Perry Lakes Hawks in the MSBL Grand Final.

Regular season
The regular season began on Friday 18 March and ended on Saturday 23 July after 19 rounds of competition.

Standings

Finals
The finals began on Friday 29 July and ended on Saturday 27 August with the MSBL Grand Final.

Bracket

Awards

Player of the Week

Statistics leaders

Regular season
 Most Valuable Player: Anthony Lee (Perry Lakes Hawks)
 Coach of the Year: Andy Stewart (Lakeside Lightning)
 Most Improved Player: Damien Scott (Cockburn Cougars)
 All-Star Five:
 PG: Ty Harrelson (Cockburn Cougars)
 SG: Luke Payne (Lakeside Lightning)
 SF: Anthony Lee (Perry Lakes Hawks)
 PF: Greg Hire (Wanneroo Wolves)
 C: Tom Jervis (East Perth Eagles)

Finals
 Grand Final MVP: Greg Hire (Wanneroo Wolves)

References

External links
 2011 fixtures
 2011 quarter-finals preview
 MSBL Power Rankings

2011
2010–11 in Australian basketball
2011–12 in Australian basketball